Sentry 2020 is a commercial software program for "transparent" disk encryption for PC and PDA. It has two compatible versions, one for desktop Windows XP and one for Windows Mobile 6.5.3, which allows using the same encrypted volume on both platforms.

The latest versions have been released in February 2011. Windows Vista is the "newest" OS supported.

See also

LibreCrypt - an alternative system which also works on both PC and PDAs
Disk encryption
Disk encryption software
Comparison of disk encryption software

External links
 Official Sentry 2020 Website

Cryptographic software
Windows security software
Disk encryption
Cross-platform software